Lee Tae-hoon (also known as Lee Tae-hun, born 18 May 1986) is a South Korean windsurfer. He competed at the 2008, 2012 and 2016 Olympics in the RS:X.

Results

References

External links
 
 
 

1986 births
Living people
South Korean windsurfers
South Korean male sailors (sport)
Olympic sailors of South Korea
Sailors at the 2008 Summer Olympics – RS:X
Sailors at the 2012 Summer Olympics – RS:X
Sailors at the 2016 Summer Olympics – RS:X
Asian Games bronze medalists for South Korea
Asian Games medalists in sailing
Sailors at the 2010 Asian Games
Sailors at the 2014 Asian Games
Sailors at the 2018 Asian Games
Medalists at the 2010 Asian Games
Medalists at the 2018 Asian Games
Universiade medalists in sailing
Universiade bronze medalists for South Korea
People from Geoje
Sportspeople from South Gyeongsang Province